The Cabinet of Seychelles consists of the President, Vice-president and the Ministers. It formulates the government's policies and advises the President.

Current Cabinet

April 2018 Cabinet

July 2017 Cabinet

2016 Cabinet

See also
 Politics of Seychelles

References

Seychelles
Politics of Seychelles
Political organisations based in Seychelles